A Slavic dragon is any dragon in Slavic mythology, including the Russian zmei (or zmey), Ukrainian zmiy, and its counterparts in other Slavic cultures: the Bulgarian zmey, the Slovak drak and šarkan, Czech drak, Polish , the Serbo-Croatian zmaj, the Macedonian zmej (змеј) and the Slovene zmaj. The Romanian zmeu is also a Slavic dragon, but a non-cognate etymology has been proposed. 

A zmei may be beast-like or human-like, sometimes wooing women, but often plays the role of chief antagonist in Russian literature.

The Polish smok (e.g. Wawel Dragon of Kraków) or the Ukrainian or Belarusian smok (смок), tsmok (цмок), can also be included. In some Slavic traditions smok is an ordinary snake which may turn into a dragon with age.

Some of the common motifs concerning Slavic dragons include their identification as masters of weather or water source; that they start life as snakes; and that both the male and female can be romantically involved with humans.

Etymology
The Slavic terms descend from Proto-Slavic *zmьjь. The further derivation that Serbo-Croatian zmaj "dragon" and  "earth" ultimately descend from the same Proto-Slavic root zьm-, from the zero grade of Proto-Indo-European *ǵhdem, was proposed by Croatian linguist Petar Skok. Lithuanian scholarship also points out that the connection of the snake (zmey) with the earthly realm is even more pronounced in folk incantations, since its name would etymologically mean 'earthly (being); that which creeps underground'.

The forms and spellings are Russian: zmei or zmey  (pl. zmei ); Ukrainian: zmiy  (pl. zmiyi ); Bulgarian: zmei  (pl. zmeiove ); Polish zmiy  (pl. żmije); Serbo-Croatian zmaj  (pl. ); Slovene zmaj zmáj or zmàj (pl. zmáji or zmáji).

Russian zmei
 

In the legends of Russia and Ukraine, a particular dragon-like creature, Zmey Gorynych ( or ), has three to twelve heads, and
Tugarin Zmeyevich (literally: "Tugarin Dragon-son"), known as zmei-bogatyr or "serpent hero", is a man-like dragon who appears in Russian (or Kievan Rus) heroic literature. The name "Tugarin" may symbolize Turkic or Mongol steppe-peoples.

Chudo-Yudo
The Chudo-Yudo (or Chudo-iudo, ; pl. Chuda-Yuda) is a multi-headed dragon that appears in some wondertale variants, usually considered to be water-dwelling. Some legends portray him as the brother of Koshchey the Deathless, and thus the offspring of the witch Baba Yaga; others present him as a personification of the witch in her foulest form. A Chudo Yudo is one of the guardians of the Water of Life and Death, and his name traditionally was invoked in times of drought. He can apparently assume human-like forms and is able to speak and to ride a horse. He has the ability to regenerate any decapitated heads.

The term Chudo-Yudo may not be a name for a specific type of dragon at all, but rather a fanciful term for a generic "monster". According to this explanation, the term is to be understood as a poetic form of chudovishche meaning "monster", with a  ending appended simply for the rhyme. Chudo in modern Russian means "a wonder", and once also had the meaning of "a giant"; "yudo" may relate to Iuda, the Russian form of the personal name  "Judas", with connotations of uncleanness and the demonic.

Three- and six-headed zmei, slain by the titular hero in "Ivan Popyalov" ("Ivan Cinders", Afanasyev's tale #135) appear as six-, nine-, and twelve-headed Chuda-Iuda in the cognate tale #137 "Ivan Bykovich". The inference is that Chudo-Yudo must also be a dragon, even though the word "serpent" (zmei) does not appear explicitly in the latter tale. The six-, nine-, and twelve-headed Chuda-Yuda that appear out of the Black Sea are explicitly described as zmei in yet another cognate tale, #136 "Storm-Bogatyr, Ivan the Cow's Son". The Storm-Bogatyr possesses a magic sword (sword Kladenets), but uses his battle club (or mace) to attack them.

A Chudo-Yudo's heads have a remarkable healing property: even if severed, he can pick them up and re-attach them with a stroke of his fiery finger, according to one of these tales, comparable to the regenerative power of the Lernaean hydra that grows its head back.

Smok

The terms smok ("serpent") and tsmok ("sucker") can signify a dragon, but also just an ordinary snake. There are Slavic folk tales in which a smok, when it reaches a certain age, grows into a dragon (zmaj, etc.). Similar lore is widespread across Slavic countries, as described below.

Some common themes

Snake into dragons
The folklore that an ancient snake grows into a dragon is fairly widespread in Slavic regions. This is also paralleled by similar lore in China.

In Bulgaria is a similar folk belief that the smok ("Aesculapian snake") begins its life-cycle as a non-venomous snake but later grows into a zmei dragon after living 40 years.

There are also among the East Slavic folk the tradition that a viper transforms into a dragon. In Ukrainian folklore the viper needs 7 years to metamorphosize into a dragon, while in Belorussian folklore the requisite time is 100 years, according to one comparison.

The weather-making dragon, ismeju (or zmeu), of Romanian Scholomance folklore is also locally believed to grow out of a snake which has lived for 9 years (belief found at "Hatzeger Thal" or Hațeg).

Weather

Locally in Ukraine, around Lutsk, the rainbow is called tsmok ("sucker") which is said to be a tube that guzzles water from the sea and rivers and carries the moisture up into the clouds.

There is the notion (thought to be inspired by the tornado) of a Slavic dragon that dips its tail into a river or lake and siphons up the water, ready to cause floods.

In Romanian folklore, dragons are ridden by weather-controlling wizards called the Solomonari. The type of dragon they ride may be the zmeu or the balaur, depending on the source.

The lamia and the hala (explained further below) are also generally perceived as weather dragons or demons.

Balkan Slavic dragons
In Bulgarian lore, the zmei is sometimes described as a scale-covered serpent-like creature with four legs and bat's wings, at other times as half-man, half-snake, with wings and a fish-like tail.

In Bulgaria, this zmei tends to be regarded as a benevolent guardian creature, while the lamya and hala were seen as detrimental towards humans.: "In the majority of folksongs these creatures [zmei, samodivi, samovili, etc.] are quite agreeable,.. The exception is the lamiá".

Zmei lovers
A favorite topic of folk songs was the male zmey-lover who may marry a woman and carry her to the underworld, or a female zmeitsa (zmeitza) who falls in love with a shepherd. When a zmei falls in love with a woman, she may "pine, languish, become pale, neglect herself.. and generally act strangely", and the victim stricken with the condition could only be cured by bathing in infusions of certain herbs, according to superstition.

In Serbia, there is the example of the epic song Carica Milica i zmaj od Jastrepca and its folktale version translated as "The Tsarina Militza and the Zmay of Yastrebatz".

Zmey of Macedonian fairy tales

In most Macedonian tales and folk songs they are described as extremely intelligent, having hypnotizing eyes. However, sometimes Zmey's could be men who would astrally project into the sky when there is a storm to battle the Lamia, a female evil version that wants to destroy the wheat. They were also known as guardians of the territory, and would even protect the people in it. Hostile behaviour was shown if another zmey comes into his territory. They could change their appearance in the form of a smoke, strong spark, fire bird, snake, cloud but almost afterwards he would gain the form of a handsome man and enter the chambers of a young maiden. They fell in love with women who were conceived on the same night as them, or born in the same day as them. He usually guards the girl from a small age and his love lasts forever. Some girls get sick by loving a zmey, and symptoms include paleness, shyness, antisocial behaviour, watery eyes, quietness and hallucinations. They didn't live a long life, because it resulted in suicide. Zmeys would kidnap girls and lead them into their mountain caves where she would serve him.

Benevolent zmei of the Balkans

There is a pan-Balkan notion that the zmei (known by various cognates) is a sort of "guardian-spirit dragon" against the "evil" types of dragon, given below. One explanation is that the Balkan zmej symbolized the patriotic dragon fighting the Turkish dragon, a way to vent the local population's frustration at not being able to overthrow the long-time Turkish rule.

Zmaj of Serbian fairy tales

The zmaj dragon in Serbian fairy tales nevertheless have sinister roles in a number of instances. In the well-known tale "A Pavilion Neither in the Sky nor on the Earth" the youngest prince succeeds in killing the dragon (zmaj) that guards the three princesses held captive.

Vuk Karadžić's collection of folktales have other examples. In "The Golden Apple-tree and the Nine Peahens", the dragon carries away the peahen maiden who is the hero's lover. In "Baš Čelik" the hero must contend with a dragon-king."Bash Tchelik or Real Steel".

Lamia
The  or lamya, derived from the Greek lamia, is also seen as a dragon-like creature in Bulgarian ethnic population, currently inhabiting Bulgaria, with equivalents in Macedonia (lamja, lamna), and South-East Serbian areas.

The Bulgarian lamia is described as reptile- or lizard-like and covered with scales, with 3–9 heads which are like dog's heads with sharp teeth. It may also have sharp claws, webbed wings, and the scales may be yellow color.

The Bulgarian lamia dwells in the bottoms of the seas and lakes, or sometimes mountainous caverns, or tree holes and can stop the supply of water to the human population, demanding sacrificial offerings to undo its deed. The lamia, bringer of drought, was considered the adversary of St. Ilya (Elijah) or a benevolent zmei.

In the Bulgarian version of Saint George and the Dragon, the dragon was a lamia. Bulgarian legends tell of how a hero (actually a double of St. George, denoted as "George of the Flowers", Cveten Gǝorgi) cuts off the heads of the three- or multi-headed Lamia, and when the hero accomplishes its destruction and sever all its heads, "rivers of fertility" are said to flow. This song about St. George's fight with the lamia occurs in ritual spiritual verse supposed to be sung around St. George's day.

One of the versions collected by ethnologist  begins: " (George of the Flowers fared out / Going around his congregation /On the road he met the fallow lamia..)". Another version collected by Marinov substitutes "Yuda-Samodiva" in the place of the lamia. Three rivers gush out of the dragons head-stumps: typically one of corn, one of red wine, and one of milk and honey. These benefitted the crop-growers, vineyard growers (winemakers), and the beekeepers and shepherds, respectively.
.

Other evil Balkan dragons
There is some overlap or conflation of the lamia and the hala (or halla), although the latter is usually conceived of as a "whirlwind". Or it might be described as regional differences. The lamia in Eastern Bulgaria is the adversary of the benevolent zmei, and the hala or ala takes its place in Western Bulgaria.

This motif of hero against the evil dragon (lamia, ala/hala, or aždaja) is found more generally throughout the Balkan Slavic region. Sometimes this hero is a saint (usually St. George). And after the hero severs all its (three) heads, "three rivers of wheat, milk, and wine" flow out of the stumps.

Hala

The demon or creature known as hala (or ala), whose name derived from the Greek word for "hail" took the appearance of a dense mist or fog, or a black cloud. Hala was believed to be the cause of strong winds and whirlwind in Eastern Bulgaria, whereas the lamya was blamed as the perpetrator in Southwestern Bulgarian lore. In Western Bulgarian tradition, the halla itself was regarded as the whirlwind, which guarded clouds and contained the rain, but was also regarded as a type of dragon, alongside the folklore that the smok (roughly equated with "grass snake" but actually the Aesculapian snake) was a crag-dwelling whirlwind.

These hala were also known in East and Central Serbia. Similar lore occur in Croatia, Bosnia and Herzegovina, Montenegro.

Aždaja
The demon hala was also called by other names regionally, in some parts of Bulgaria they were known as aždarha or ažder, in Macedonian as aždaja or ažder, in Serbian as aždaja.

As an example, in some local Croatian icons, St. George is represented as slaying the aždaja and not a zmaj.

Pozoj
A pozoj is a dragon of legends in Croatia. In Međimurje County, the Čakovec pozoj was said to dwell beneath the city, with its head under the church and tail under the town square, or vice versa, and it could only be gotten rid of by a grabancijaš (a "wandering scholar", glossed as a "black [magic] student").

The pozoj is also known in Slovenia, and according to legend there is one living underneath Zagreb, causing an earthquake whenever it shrugs. Poet  (1866) has published some tales concerning the pozoj in the Slovenski glasnik magazine, which also connected the creature to the črne škole dijak ("black school student"), which other Slovene sources call črnošolec ("sorcerer's apprentice"), and which some equate with a grabancijaš dijakDragons in Slovenia are generally negative in nature, and usually appear in relation with St. George. The Slovene god-hero Kresnik is known as a dragonslayer.

Representations

There are natural and man-made structures that have dragon lore attached to them. There are also representations in sculpture and painting. In iconography, Saint George and the Dragon is prominent in Slavic areas. The dragon is a common motif in heraldry, and the coat of arms of a number of cities or families depict dragons.

The Dragon Bridge in Ljubljana, Slovenia depicts dragons associated with the city or said to be the city's guardians, and the city's coat of arms features a dragon (representing the one slain by Kresnik).

The coat of arms of Moscow also depicts a St George (symbolizing Christianity) killing the Dragon (symbolizing the Golden Horde).Soboleva, N. A. (2002),  [Russian State Symbols: History and Modernity], Moscow, Vlados, p. 43. .

Some prehistoric structures, notably the Serpent's Wall near Kyiv, have been associated with dragons as symbols of foreign peoples.

In popular culture
 Ilya Muromets (1956 film), Zmey Gorynych, or as 'Zuma the Fire Dragon' in the English version. 
  (1965 animation, Soyuzmultfilm)
  ("A Pavilion Neither in the Sky nor on the Earth", 1978 animation)

See also

 Chuvash dragon
 Smok Wawelski – dragon of Kraków
 Zahhak (or Aži Dahāka) – Iranian dragon
 žaltys
 zduhać
 Zilant – dragon of Kazan
 Zirnitra – Wendish dragon and god of sorcery
 Dobrynya Nikitich and Zmey Gorynych (2006 animated feature film)
 Mavrud wine - story of a lion or lamya defeated by hero
 Coats of arms of Ljubljana
 Serpent's Wall, according to a legend, plowed by a dragon

Explanatory notes

References
Citations

Bibliography

 

 

 [Translation of ]

. 

 

 [Translation of ]

Further reading
 Baeva, Virha. "Loved by a Dragon: Topoi and Idiosyncrasies in Oral Narratives from Bulgaria". In: Études balkaniques 1 (2016): 128-150.
"Zmeys and Zmeyitsas (Bulgarian)". In: Sherman, Josepha (2008). Storytelling: An Encyclopedia of Mythology and Folklore''. Sharpe Reference. p. 522. 

Dragons
Bulgarian folklore
Russian mythology
European dragons
Magic (supernatural)
Characters in Bylina
Slovene mythology
Mythical many-headed creatures